Vätti is a district of the city of Turku, in Finland. It is located to the north of the city centre. The area consists mostly of parkland, but there is also a high-density residential area in the district as well as some low-density developments. There is also an old people's home in Vätti.

The current population of Vätti is 2,990, and it is decreasing at an annual rate of 0.07%. 11.30% of the district's population are under 15 years old, while 30.60% are over 65. The district's linguistic makeup is 95.45% Finnish, 2.37% Swedish, and 2.17% other.

See also
 Districts of Turku
 Districts of Turku by population

Districts of Turku